The 2005 Tour de Langkawi was the 10th edition of the Tour de Langkawi, a cycling stage race that took place in Malaysia. It began on 28 January in Langkawi and ended on 6 February in Kuala Lumpur. The race was rated by the Union Cycliste Internationale (UCI) as a 2.HC (hors category) race on the 2005 UCI Asia Tour calendar.

Ryan Cox of South Africa won the race, followed by José Rujano of Venezuela second and Tiaan Kannemeyer of South Africa third. Graeme Brown won the points classification category and Cox won the mountains classification category.  won the team classification category.

Stages
The cyclists competed in 10 stages, covering a distance of 1,284.6 kilometres.

Classification leadership

Final standings

General classification

Points classification

Mountains classification

Asian rider classification

Team classification

Asian team classification

List of teams and riders
A total of 20 teams were invited to participate in the 2005 Tour de Langkawi. Out of the 140 riders, a total of 101 riders made it to the finish in Kuala Lumpur.

 
  Marlon Pérez Arango
  Moreno Di Biase
  Raffaele Illiano
  José Rujano
  Leonardo Scarselli
  Russel Van Hout
  Trent Wilson
 
  Julian Dean
  Eric Leblacher
  Christophe Le Mével
  Geoffroy Lequatre
  Saul Raisin
  Yannick Talabardon
  Nicolas Vogondy
 
  Michael Barry
  Fumiyuki Beppu
  Michael Creed
  Antonio Cruz
  Tom Danielson
  Patrick McCarty
  Hayden Roulston
 
  Ruggero Borghi
  Cristian Bonfanti
  Sergio Ghisalberti
  Enrico Grigoli
  Maxim Iglinsky
  Matej Jurčo
  Luca Solari
 
  Joseba Beloki
  René Andrle
  Dariusz Baranowski
  Koen de Kort
  Jesús Hernández
  Jörg Jaksche
  Nuno Ribeiro

 
  Claudio Astolfi
  Denis Bertolini
  Antonio Bucciero
  Alessandro D'Andrea
  Valery Kobzarenko
  Giuseppe Palumbo
  Leonardo Moser
 
  Bogdan Bondariew
  Marcin Osinski
  Piotr Chmielewski
  Dennis Kraft
  Zbigniew Piątek
  Kazimierz Stafiej
  Adam Wadecki
 
  Tom Southam
  Ryan Cox
  Rodney Green
  Tiaan Kannemeyer
  David Plaza
  Antonio Salomone
  René Jørgensen
 
  Mirko Allegrini
  Fortunato Baliani
  Guillermo Bongiorno
  Graeme Brown
  Brett Lancaster
  Sergiy Matveyev
  Julio Alberto Pérez
 
  Johan Verstrepen
  Geert Verheyen
  Grégory Habeaux
  Sven Renders
  Nico Sijmens
  James Van Landschoot
  Jurgen Van de Walle

 
  Stefan van Dijk
  Frédéric Gabriel
  Sven Renders
  Camille Bouquet
  Benjamin Day
  Kurt Van De Wouwer
  Peter Wuyts
 
  Vassili Davidenko
  Cesar Grajales
  Oleg Grishkin
  Jeffry Louder
  Nathan O'Neill
  Mark Walters
 Wiesenhof
  Ralf Grabsch
  Jens Heppner
  David Kopp
  Martin Müller
  Enrico Poitschke
  Steffen Radochla
  Lars Wackernagel
 Proton T-Bikes
  Fallanie Ali
  Suhardi Hassan
  Wan Mohammad Najmee
  Ng Yong Li
  Mohd Fauzan Ahmad Lutfi
  Razif Jaffar
  Mohd Jasmin Ruslan
 Bridgestone Anchor
  Shinichi Fukushima
  Koji Fukushima
  Takehiro Mizutani
  Takashi Miyazawa
  Miyataka Shimizu
  Yasutaka Tashiro
  Shinji Suzuki

 Wismilak
  Tonton Susanto
  David McKenzie
  Wawan Setyobudi
  Sama'i Sama'i
  Christopher Bradford
  Matnur Matnur
  Adi Wibowo
 Great Britain
  Rob Hayles
  Kristian House
  Chris Newton
  Paul Manning
  Dean Downing
  Thomas White
  Julian Winn
 Iran
  Hassan Maleki
  Ahad Kazemi
  Ghader Mizbani
  Alireza Haghi
  Hossein Askari
  Moezeddin Seyed-Rezaei
  Mehdi Sohrabi
 Republic of Ireland
  David McCann
  Paul Healion
  Stephen Gallagher
  Paidi O'Brien
  Roger Aitken
  Paul Griffin
  Seán Lacey
 Malaysia
  Shahrulneeza Razali
  Mohd Mahadzir Hamad
  Mohd Yusof Abd Nasir
  Musairi Musa
  Nor Effendy Rosli
  Mohd Fuad Daud
  Mohd Rizal Ramle

References

2005
2005 in road cycling
2005 in Malaysian sport